van Velde is a surname. Notable people with the surname include:

Bram van Velde (1895–1981), Dutch painter
Geer van Velde (1898–1977), Dutch painter, brother of Bram
Gerard van Velde (born 1971), Dutch speed skater

See also
Van de Velde

Surnames of Dutch origin